Jaroslav Hlava (7 May 1855 – 31 October 1924) was a Czech anatomical pathologist.

In 1879, he graduated from the Medical Faculty of Charles University in Prague. In 1887, he became a full professor of pathological anatomy. He was rector of Prague's General Hospital and director of the Czech Institute of Pathological Anatomy. He was a pioneer in bacteriology and studied the etiology of infectious diseases and oncology.

In 1887, Hlava authored a widely cited article entitled About Dysentery. Due to a translation error, the article was attributed to O. Uplavici in English publications until 1938. The name of author was written in small characters, and the translator mistook O ÚPLAVICI (About dysentery in Czech) for the name of the author and PŘEDBĚŽNÁ ZPRÁVA (preliminary report) for About Dysentery. The mistake was corrected in 1939 by English biologist Clifford Dobell, writing about the history of this mistake in the article "Dr. O. Uplavici (1887–1938)".

References

External links
 (General article about mistakes in citation, with "O. Uplavici" as an example on page 3.)

1855 births
1924 deaths
Czech pathologists
Charles University alumni
Academic staff of Charles University